Alocasia lauterbachiana, the purple sword, silver sword, or baroque sword, is a species of flowering plant in the family Araceae, native to northern New Guinea and the Bismarck Archipelago. With its upward-pointing leaves reaching , it is kept as a houseplant and is readily available in commerce.

References

lauterbachiana
House plants
Flora of New Guinea
Flora of the Bismarck Archipelago
Plants described in 1990